The Applications Technology Satellites (ATS) were a series of experimental satellites launched by NASA, under the supervision of, among others, Wernher von Braun. The program was launched in 1966 to test the feasibility of placing a satellite into geosynchronous orbit. The satellites were primarily designed to act as communication satellites, but also carried equipment related to meteorology and navigation. ATS-6 was the world's first educational satellite as well as world's first experimental Direct Broadcast Satellite (DBS) as part of the Satellite Instructional Television Experiment (SITE) between NASA and ISRO.

Summary of Missions

See also

 Geostationary Operational Environmental Satellite
 Synchronous Meteorological Satellite

References

External links

ATS at NASA's Mission and Spacecraft Library
ATS, Past NASA Missions
ATS, NASA Science Missions
ATS-E - Press Kit